The Communes of Senegal are the fourth-level administrative divisions in Senegal (below country, region and department). There are some 121 communes in Senegal which have urban status (communes de ville), apart from 46 communes d'arrondissement in the large towns and 370 rural communities (communautés rurales) in the countryside.

History

Dakar Region

Dakar Department
Dakar (19 communes d'arrondissement)

Guédiawaye Department
Guediawaye (5 communes d'arrondissement)

Pikine Department
Pikine (16 communes d'arrondissement)

Rufisque Department
Rufisque (3 communes d'arrondissement)
Bargny
Diamniadio
Sébikhotane
Jaxaay-Parcelle-Niakoul Rap
Sangalkam
Sendou

Diourbel Region

Bambey Department
Bambey

Diourbel Department
Diourbel

Mbacké Department
Mbacké

Fatick Region

Fatick Department
Diakhao
Diofior
Fatick

Foundiougne Department
Foundiougne
Karang Poste
Passy
Sokone
Soum

Gossas Department
Gossas

Kaffrine Region

Birkilane Department
Birkilane

Kaffrine Department
Kaffrine
Nganda

Koungheul Department
Koungheul

Malem Hodar Department
Malem-Hodar

Kaolack Region

Guinguinéo Department
Guinguinéo
MbossSoum
FassSoum

Kaolack Department
Gandiaye
Kahone
Kaolack
Ndoffane
SibassorSoum

Nioro du Rip Department
Nioro du Rip
Keur MadiabelSoum

Kédougou Region

Kédougou Department
Kédougou

Salémata Department
Salémata

Saraya Department
Saraya

Kolda Region

Kolda Department
Kolda
DaboSoum
SalikégnéDaboSoum
DaboSoum

Médina Yoro Foulah Department
Médina Yoro Foulah
Pata

Vélingara Department
Vélingara
Kounkané
Diaobé-Kabendou

Louga Region

Kébémer Department
Kébémer
Guéoul

Linguère Department
Dahra
Linguère
Mbeuleukhé

Louga Department
Louga
Ndiagne

Matam Region

Kanel Department
Dembakané
Hamady Hounaré
Kanel
Semmé
Sinthiou Bamambé-Banadji
Waounde
Odobere

Matam Department
Matam
Ourossogui
Thilogne
Nguidilogne

Ranérou Ferlo Department
Ranérou

Saint-Louis Region

Dagana Department
Dagana
Gaé
Richard Toll
Ross Béthio
Rosso
N'Dombo Sandjiry

Podor Department
Aéré Lao
Bodé Lao
Démette
Galoya Toucouleur
Golléré
Guédé
Mboumba
Niandane
Ndioum
Pété
Podor

Walaldé

Saint-Louis Department
Saint-Louis
Mpal

Sédhiou Region

Bounkiling Department
Bounkiling
Madina Wandifa
N'Diamacouta

Goudomp Department
Diattacounda
Goudomp
Samine
Tanaff

Sédhiou Department
Diannah Malary
Marsassoum
Sédhiou

Tambacounda Region

Bakel Department
Bakel
Diawara
Kidira

Goudiry Department
Goudiry
KothiaryDiattacounda

Koumpentoum Department
Koumpentoum
Malem Niani

Tambacounda Department
Tambacounda

Thiès Region

M'bour Department
Joal-Fadiouth
M'Bour
Ngaparou
Nguékhokh
Popenguine-NdayaneDiattacounda
Saly
SomoneDiattacounda
Thiadiaye

Thiès Department
Thiès (3 communes d'arrondissement)
KayarDiattacounda
Khombole
Pout

Tivaouane Department
Mboro
Meckhe
Tivaouane

Ziguinchor Region

Bignona Department
Bignona
Diouloulou
Thionck Essyl

Oussouye Department
Oussouye

Ziguinchor Department
Ziguinchor

See also
Rural communities of Senegal

References
Senegalaisement.com 

 
Senegal